was a town located in Saihaku District, Tottori Prefecture, Japan.

As of 2003, the town had an estimated population of 4,086 and a population density of 132.02 persons per km². The total area was 30.95 km².

On October 1, 2004, Aimi, along with the town of Saihaku (also from Saihaku District), was merged to create the town of Nanbu.

External links
Official town website 

Dissolved municipalities of Tottori Prefecture